The 1927 Birmingham–Southern Panthers football team was an American football team that represented Birmingham–Southern College as a member of the Southern Intercollegiate Athletic Association during the 1927 college football season. In their fourth season under head coach Harold Drew, the team compiled a 3–6 record.

Schedule

References

Birmingham–Southern
Birmingham–Southern Panthers football seasons
Birmingham–Southern Panthers football